Liu Yuh-san (born 30 October 1944) is a Taiwanese politician.

Education
Liu obtained his doctoral degree in engineering from National Cheng Kung University.

Political career
He was the Secretary-General of the Executive Yuan from 2006 to 2007. Liu then served as a member of the Control Yuan from 2008 to 2014.

References

1944 births
Living people
National Cheng Kung University alumni
Taiwanese Members of the Control Yuan